The Andaman wood pigeon (Columba palumboides) is a species of bird in the family Columbidae. It is endemic to the Andaman and Nicobar Islands in India. Classified as 'near threatened' by the IUCN, its population is estimated as between 2,500 and 10,000 mature individuals.

Description 
Its head is white with a red yellow-tipped beak. The rest of its body is black. It is related to the green imperial pigeon and the rock dove.

References

External links 
 Andaman Wood Pigeon Breed Guide from Pigeonpedia.com

Andaman wood pigeon
Andaman wood pigeon
Near threatened animals
Near threatened biota of Asia
Andaman wood pigeon
Taxonomy articles created by Polbot